Purbolinggo or Linggo is a kecamatan (district) of the East Lampung Regency (Lampung Timur) in Lampung province, on Sumatra, in Indonesia.

The district is located to the east of Sukadana and to the northeast of Bandar Lampung (the Capital City of Lampung province), about 70 kilometres (43 mi) away.

Village 
Purbolinggo is divided into twelve administrative villages, there are shown on table below:

Border 
The border district of Purbolinggo as follows ;
 Bordered by Way Bungur District to the North.
 Bordered by Sukadana District to the South.
 Bordered by North Raman District to the West.
 Bordered by Way Kambas National Park to the East.

List of schools

Middle schools 
 SMP Negeri 1 Purbolinggo
 SMP Negeri 2 Purbolinggo
 SMP Islam Purbolinggo
 SMP Muhammadiyah 1 Purbolinggo
 SMP PGRI Purbolinggo
 SLB Negeri Kabupaten Lampung Timur

Senior high schools 
 SMA Negeri 1 Purbolinggo
 SMA Muhammadiyah 1 Purbolinggo
 SMA Ma'arif NU 5 Purbolinggo
 SMK Ma'arif NU Purbolinggo
 SMK Budi Bhakti Purbolinggo

Tourism 
 Sejuk Permai Resort (Swimming Pool and Billiard Center), in Toto Harjo.
 Elephant Response Unit (ERUs), in Tegal Yoso.
 Kusuma Jaya I and Kusuma Jaya II Dam, in Tanjung Kesuma.
 Tani Monument, in Taman Fajar

References

East Lampung Regency
Districts of Lampung